Iron Crown Enterprises (ICE) is a publishing company that has produced role playing, board, miniature, and collectible card games since 1980. Many of ICE's better-known products were related to J. R. R. Tolkien's world of Middle-earth, but the Rolemaster rules system, and its science-fiction equivalent, Space Master, have been the foundation of ICE's business.

History

Early years and Rolemaster
In college in the late 1970s, while running a six-year Dungeons & Dragons campaign set in J.R.R. Tolkien's Middle-earth, Pete Fenlon, S. Coleman Charlton, and Kurt Fischer began to develop a set of unique house rules; after most of them had graduated from the University of Virginia in 1980, many of the group's principals decided to turn their rules into a business and formed Iron Crown Enterprises (ICE), named after a regalia of Middle-earth. Besides Fenlon and Charlton, the original ICE also included Richard H. Britton, Terry K. Amthor, Bruce Shelley, Bruce Neidlinger, Kurt Fischer, Heike Kubasch, Olivia Johnston, and a few others. The company originally only had a few full-time staff, relying on volunteer work from the other founders. But as income increased, it brought more on as employees.

ICE quickly published three products: Arms Law (1980), The Iron Wind (1980), and Manassas (1981). Arms Law was the first release of the house rules from the University of Virginia days, and thus became the start of Rolemaster, although at that time Rolemaster was not seen as a standalone RPG but was offered as an alternative combat system for AD&D. The Iron Wind was a system-generic campaign centered on a fantastic island, and although it was unsupplemented for years it would eventually be recognized as the first release in ICE's Loremaster campaign setting. Manassas was an American Civil War-era wargame set in ICE's home state of Virginia.

ICE began by publishing a series of rules supplements, beginning with Arms Law, which were intended to serve as modular add-ons to other RPG systems offering greater detail. This was followed by Spell Law (1982), Character Law (1982), and Campaign Law (1984). In time, these supplements were tied together to form an RPG system of their own, Rolemaster. Concurrent with the rules supplements, ICE began releasing world campaign content materials in what was originally called the Loremaster series, beginning with The Iron Wind.

Middle-earth RPG line and expansion
Rolemaster had grown out of a Middle-earth game, so ICE approached Tolkien Enterprises seeking a license to The Hobbit and The Lord of the Rings, which Tolkien Enterprises granted because no one else had ever asked. Tolkien Enterprises signed an exclusive, worldwide license with ICE in 1982, and ICE started the Middle-earth line off with a generic sourcebook that could be used with AD&D or other games, called A Campaign and Adventure Guidebook for Middle-earth (1982).

The company enjoyed a sudden jump in status when it acquired the license to produce an official fantasy RPG based upon J. R. R. Tolkien's world of Middle-earth, which would come to be known as "Middle-earth Role Playing" (MERP), 1982. According to some interpretations, at the time of its publication ICE's Middle-earth Role Playing was the second best selling fantasy RPG after TSR's Dungeons & Dragons.

ICE then added the science fiction RPGs Spacemaster (1985) and Cyberspace (1989) to its line. ICE also published a moderately successful space miniatures battle game called Silent Death (1990), based on Spacemaster but with simpler mechanics. Silent Death was released in two major editions, with supplemental books and a fair number of paintable lead miniatures. ICE also expanded its original Loremaster supplements into a full-blown fantasy world to support Rolemaster, called the Shadow World, supported by dozens of adventures and sourcebooks. ICE signed in 1986 a publication contract to take over Hero Games' production and distribution.  Later with Hero Games staff leaving for other jobs, ICE took over the creative reins of Hero's products.

Iron Crown branched out into the solo gaming books under the Tolkien Quest (later called Middle-earth Quest, 1985-), Sherlock Holmes Solo Mysteries (1987-) and Narnia Solo Games (1988-) book lines. Unknown to ICE at the time, the Middle-earth Quest books violated ICE and Tolkien Enterprises' contract with Tolkien's book publishing licensee, George Allen & Unwin. ICE and TE considered the books to be games, and so fall under their license, but the format came too close to being literary books. ICE was forced to recall and destroy the whole line of books, at devastating cost.  Meanwhile, ICE sued the Narnia licensor as they turned out to not have the necessary rights to license Narnia to ICE. That company went bankrupt from the legal settlement and was unable to pay ICE their damages. ICE reached terms in 1988 for a gamebook license with the estate of J.R.R. Tolkien and George Allen & Unwin for four new Middle-earth Quest books, beginning with A Spy in Isengard.  However, the solo game book market was going soft by this time. ICE canceled all solo game book lines, with dozens of books still in development. Returns were high on the Sherlock Holmes Solo Mysteries line. All this brought ICE to near bankruptcy in a "voluntary-type of receivership".

Middle-earth CCG and demise
With the rise of collectible card games, ICE released Middle-earth Collectible Card Game (1995-) and Warlords CCG (1997-). In 1997 ICE bailed out Mayfair Games, a publisher well known for Settlers of Catan board game.

Despite ICE's many successes and overcoming many setbacks over 17 years, in 1997 ICE suffered financial difficulties from a rapid decline in its distribution net; nearly 70% of ICE's distributors either went bankrupt or became moribund. There has been some debate over whether Tolkien Enterprises forced ICE into bankruptcy in order to get the gaming license in anticipation of the upcoming new movie franchise.

The company entered bankruptcy and filed for Chapter 7 in October 2000. This bankruptcy cost ICE the Middle-earth license, ending both the MERP and MECCG lines. Many of the authors and illustrators were not paid for substantial amounts of work.

Aurigas Aldebaron

In December 2001, ICE's assets were purchased by Aurigas Aldebaron LLLC, an intellectual property ownership company backed by several wealthy individuals.  The new owners licensed the Iron Crown Enterprise name and other assets to Mjolnir LLC until 2011. Starting in January 2011, licensing was transferred to Guild Companion Publications Ltd.

In 2016 Aurigas Alderbaron merged with Guild Companion Publications Ltd to create a single company: Guild Companion Publications. This company both holds the Iron Crown Enterprises intellectual property and produces and sells Iron Crown products.

On January 9, 2017 Guild Companion Publications Limited officially changed its name to Iron Crown Enterprises Ltd.

Iron Crown Enterprises Ltd
Iron Crown Enterprises continues to produce products for its Rolemaster and High Adventure Role Playing (HARP) line, including products set in the Shadow World.

Publications

Board games
 Manassas (1980)
 The Riddle of the Ring (1982)
 The Battle of Five Armies (1984)
 The Lonely Mountain - Lair of Smaug the Dragon (1984)
 Cleric's Revenge (1985)
 Star Strike (1988)
 Armored Assault (1989)
 The Hobbit Adventure (1994)

Solo gaming books
 Tolkien Quest/Middle-earth Quest line
 Night of the Nazgûl (1985)
 The Legend of Weathertop (1985)
 Rescue in Mirkwood (1986)
 Murder at Minas Tirith (unpublished)
 A Spy in Isengard (1988)
 Treason at Helm's Deep (1988)
 The Mines of Moria (1988)
 Search for the Palantir (1989)
 Sherlock Holmes Solo Mysteries line
 Murder at the Diogenes Club (1987)
 The Black River Emerald (1987)
 Death at Appledore Towers (1987)
 The Crown vs. Dr. Watson (1988)
 The Dynamiters (1988)
 The Royal Flush (1988)
 Honor of the Yorkshire Light Artillery (1988)
 Narnia Solo Games line
 Return to Deathwater (1988)
 Leap of the Lion (1988)
 The Lost Crowns of Cair Paravel (1988)
 Return of the White Witch (1988)
 The Sorceress and the Book of Spells (1988)

Role-playing games
 The Iron Wind (1981)
 A Campaign and Adventure Guidebook for Middle-earth (1982)
 Angmar: Land of the Witch King (1982) - sourcebook
 Umbar: Haven of the Corsairs (1982)
 Ardor in Southern Middle-earth (1983)
 Isengard and Northern Gondor (1983)
 Northern Mirkwood: The Wood-Elves Realm (1983)
 Southern Mirkwood: Haunt of the Necromancer (1983)
 Middle-earth Role Playing (1984)
 Bree and the Barrow-Downs (1984)
 Dagorlad and the Dead Marshes (1984)
 Hillmen of the Trollshaws (1984)
 Middle-earth Role Playing Combat Screen (1984)
 Moria: The Dwarven City (1984)
 The Tower of Cirith Ungol and Shelob's Lair (1984)
 Erech and the Paths of the Dead (1985)
 Rangers of the North: The Kingdom of Arthedain (1985)
 Lords of Middle-earth, Volume I (1986)
 Lórien & The Halls of the Elven Smiths (1986)
 Trolls of the Misty Mountains (1986)
 Ents of Fangorn (1987)
 Lords of Middle-earth, Volume II (1987)
 Creatures of Middle-earth (1988)
 Minas Tirith (1988)
 Angus McBride's Characters of Middle-earth (1990)
 Ghost Warriors (1990)
 Gorgoroth (1990)
 Minas Ithil (1991)
 Palantir Quest (1994)
 Kin-Strife (1995)
 Hands of the Healer (1997)
 Rolemaster - A role playing game system.
 Arms Law (1980)
 Spell Law (1981)
 Character Law (1982)
 Claw Law (1982)
 War Law (1991)
 Sea Law (1994)
 Rolemaster (1982)
 Campaign Law (1984)
 Creatures & Treasures (1985)
 Rolemaster, second edition (1986)
 Rolemaster Companion (1986)
 Rolemaster second edition 2nd iteration (1989)
 Elemental Companion (1989)
 Shadow World Master Atlas (1989)
 Outlaw - a historical setting source book for Rolemaster (1991)
 At Rapier's Point - a historical setting source book for Rolemaster (1993)
 Oriental Companion - a historical setting source book for Rolemaster (1993)
 Shadow World: The Cloudlords of Tanara (1982, 2013)
 Shadow World Master Atlas (4th Edition) (2003, 2011)
 Shadow World Master Atlas (3rd Edition) (2001, 2011)
 Shadow World powers of Light and Darkness (2003, 2011)
 Demons on the Burning Night (1989, 2011)
 Islands of the Oracle (1989, 2011)
 Kingdom of the Desert Jewel (1989, 2011)
 Quellbourne: Land of the Silver Mist (1989, 2011)
 Shadow World: Haalkitaine & The Court of Rhakhaan (2019)
 Shadow World: Jaiman : Land of Twilight (2018)
 Shadow World: Eidolon: City in the Sky (2015)
 Shadow World: Tales from the Green Gryphon Inn (2015)
 Shadow World: Emer III (2014)
 Spacemaster - An adaption of Rolemaster system in a sci-fi setting. First edition (1985), second edition (1988)
 Future Law (1985)
 Tech Law (1985)
 Action On Akaisha Outstation (1985)
 Imperial Crisis (1985)
 Spacemaster Companion (1986)
 Lost Telepaths (1986)
 Beyond The Core (1987)
 The Cygnus Conspiracy (1987)
 Tales From Deep Space (1988)
 War on a Distant Moon (1988)
 The Durandrium Find (1989)
 Disaster on Adanis III (1989)
 Raiders from the Frontier (1989)
 Spacemaster Companion I (1990)
 Dark Space (1990)
 Aliens & Artifacts (1991)
 Time Riders (1992)
 Spacemaster Companion II (1994)
 Cyberspace (1989)
 Cyberspace Core Rulebook (1989)
 Sprawlgangs & Megacorps (1990)
 Edge-On (1990)
 CyberRogues (1990)
 The Body Bank (1990)
 Death Valley Free Prison (1990)
 Death Game 2090 (1990)
 Cyberskelter (1991)
 Chicago Arcology (1991)
 Cyber Europe (1991, 2015)
 Campaign Classics line - dual statted for Hero System and Rolemaster:
 Robin Hood the Role Playing Campaign (1987)
 Mythic Greece (1988)
 Vikings (1989)
 Pirates (1989)
 Mythic Egypt (1990)
 Arabian Nights (1994)  -  a "Rolemaster Genre Book" without Hero System stats
 Lord of the Rings Adventure Game (1991)
 High Adventure Role Playing (2003, 2004, 2011)
 HARP College of Magics (2004, 2013)
 HARP Martial Law (2003, 2004, 2013)
 HARP Loot (2016)
 HARP Folkways (2017)
 HARP A Wedding in Axebridge (2017)
 HARP Bestiary (2021)
 HARP Garden of Rain (2021)
 HARP Beyond the Veil (2022)

Miniatures games
 Silent Death (1990)
 Bladestorm (1990)

Collectible card games
 Middle-earth Collectible Card Game (1995)
 Warlords Collectible Card Game (1997)

References

External links
 Company Website

Game manufacturers
Role-playing game publishing companies
Companies that have filed for Chapter 7 bankruptcy